The Kristianstad Ladies Open is a professional golf tournament on the Ladies European Tour (LET). 

The tournament is played  at Kristianstad Golf Club in Åhus, southern Sweden. It was first played in 1986, before being cancelled in 1987. It featured on the LET Access Series 2012–2014, and was slated to return to the LET schedule in 2020 as the Creekhouse Ladies Open, but the event was postponed to 2021 due to the COVID-19 pandemic.

Winners

Source:

References

External links
Ladies European Tour

Ladies European Tour events
LET Access Series events
Golf tournaments in Sweden